César Troncoso (born 5 April 1963) is a Uruguayan actor. He appeared in more than 30 films since 2002.

Selected filmography

Bibliography

References

External links 

1963 births
Living people
Uruguayan male film actors